Taisa Naskovich (born 19 September 1995) is a Belarusian professional racing cyclist, who currently rides for UCI Women's Continental Team .

References

External links

1995 births
Living people
Belarusian female cyclists
Place of birth missing (living people)
European Games competitors for Belarus
Cyclists at the 2019 European Games